Euseius subplebeius is a species of mite in the family Phytoseiidae.

References

subplebeius
Articles created by Qbugbot
Animals described in 1984